Tyrande Whisperwind is a fictional character who appears in the Warcraft series of video games by Blizzard Entertainment. First appearing in Warcraft III: Reign of Chaos, within the games, she is the chosen High Priestess of the goddess Elune, and along with her husband Malfurion Stormrage, the leader of the night elves. Tyrande also appears as a playable character in the crossover multiplayer online battle arena game Heroes of the Storm. The character has received mostly positive critical reception from gamers, and is a popular character in Warcraft lore. She is voiced by Elisa Gabrielli.

Development 
In an interview with World of Warcraft: Mists of Pandaria designer Dave Kosak, Kosak stated that "To speak about Tyrande specifically, we wanted to get back to her Warcraft III roots, in which she was very much gung-ho. So when we wanted to show Varian's development, we thought she'd be an interesting foil", referring to her appearance as a foil for Varian Wrynn in the "A Little Patience" scenario. In an interview with Christie Golden, writer of the Warcraft novel War Crimes, she mentioned that the book contains "a lot of" Tyrande, and "I can say we will see a lot of her and we will get inside her head for sure."

Appearances

Warcraft franchise

In the series, Tyrande Whisperwind, the High Priestess of Elune, is the current co-leader of the night elves (kaldorei), along with her husband Archdruid Malfurion Stormrage. Tyrande was born thousands of years ago and grew up in the company of Malfurion and Illidan Stormrage. She answered the call of the Sisters of Elune, followers of the night elves' Goddess of the Moon, and became a novice priestess, while the Stormrage brothers followed different paths. Their destinies merged anew when the Burning Legion arrived on Azeroth.

Tyrande and Malfurion grew close and battled against the invading demons together, but Illidan pursued a darker path, feigning allegiance to the Burning Legion and succumbing to the temptations of power. After the defeat of the Legion and the Sundering, Tyrande and Malfurion helped rebuild elven society; Illidan was imprisoned beneath Mount Hyjal. The couple could not remain together for long; soon after the night elves settled near Mount Hyjal, Malfurion and the other night elf druids were needed in the Emerald Dream. While Malfurion slept in the Dream, Tyrande commanded her people, forming the Sentinels—the night elven army—to guard their lands and allies.

During the Third War, Tyrande sent her Sentinels to deter the advances of the Horde in Kalimdor, but ultimately ended up working with them to battle the armies of the Burning Legion, an effort that also forced her to awaken the druids, including Malfurion, from the Emerald Dream. Their time together was cut short when the elder Stormrage suffered from the corruption of the Dream, but Tyrande joined her lover to defeat the menace, and they both returned to Azeroth, where they protected their people (and the other races of the Alliance) from the destruction caused by Deathwing and the advances of Garrosh Hellscream in Kalimdor.

Heroes of the Storm 
Tyrande appears as a playable character in the crossover video game Heroes of the Storm. She is a ranged healer who helps her allies lockdown and finish off enemies. Her basic abilities include marking enemy targets, healing allies which can become more frequent with attacking enemies, as well as summoning owls to scout out enemy positions. "Starfall" is one of the two heroic abilities, which damages and slow enemies in an area. Second heroic ability is "Shadowstalk", which grants all allied heroes stealth for several seconds and heal them over time.

Other appearances 
She also appears in the World of Warcraft Trading Card Game as a collectible card. In Hearthstone, Tyrande Whisperwind is an alternate hero for the Priest class, who is optionally unlockable as a visual alteration for the default priest hero.

Reception 

The character has received mostly positive reception. Anne Stickney of Engadget found that "in the end, Tyrande Whisperwind is a bit of an enigma. Despite thousands of years leading her people, she's still prone to moments of uncertainty and seems to lean on the mostly absent Malfurion more often than entirely necessary. For a leader who has spent so long standing on her own, Tyrande wavers back and forth between standing on her own two feet and depending on others. It makes her a confusing character, to say the very least—but she isn't without strength. She has the kind of strength to lead her people through three different wars, the wisdom to call upon the help of others when necessary, and above all, the patience to deal with life's little annoyances with tranquil rationality." This dependency on Malfurion was further criticised by Stickney while reviewing the "lamentable state" of female characters in Warcraft by labelling her as a "barnacle character", since "because given everything we've been told about Tyrande, it certainly couldn't have been her. The Tyrande we've been shown hasn't appeared to be the type of person who could lead an entire race. What has been implied here is that Tyrande is not a leader unless Malfurion is there at her side", and that this relegates her to "a character whose entire existence is dependent on and wrapped around the existence of another."

Engadget's Alex Ziebart wrote that "Tyrande Whisperwind has been a central part of the Alliance since way back in vanilla WoW. She was one of the key figures in the events of Warcraft III, and she's had a substantial role in the course of Azeroth as a whole." However, her relationship with Malfurion was still criticised, as "Tyrande, a powerful and dangerous woman, is instantly backseated the moment her beloved beau [Malfurion] shows up on the scene", and "the display of strength she pulls off [...] is immediately forgotten about [...] everything she does occurs in the background." Yannick Lejacq of Kotaku listed the references to the relationship between Tyrande and Illidan as one of the positive aspects of Heroes of the Storm, saying "Tyrande Whisperwind and Illidan Stormrage have a tenuous romantic past from their days together in World of Warcraft [...] It's a little nod to the World of Warcraft fans playing Heroes." 2p.com, while writing about the character of Malfurion Stormrage, also mentioned his relationship with Tyrande.

Tyrande has become a popular character in Warcraft lore, and is featured in various merchandise related to the franchise. She featured on a custom Warcraft version of Monopoly as a $20 note, with Mike Fahey of Kotaku writing "High Priestess of the Goddess Elune and the highest authority of the Night Elves, Tyrande Whisperwind is no run-of-the-mill pointy ear. She's the main squeeze of Archdruid Malfurion Stormrage, for crying out loud. She's one of the most powerful living females in Azeroth." The character is also a popular subject to cosplay as.

References

External links 

Female characters in video games
Fictional archers
Fictional elves
Fictional female religious workers
Fictional heads of state
Fictional hunters in video games
Fictional murderers
Fictional priests and priestesses
Fictional war veterans
Religious worker characters in video games
Video game characters introduced in 2002
Video game characters who can turn invisible
Woman soldier and warrior characters in video games
Warcraft characters